Douglas Township may refer to:

Illinois 
 Douglas Township, Clark County, Illinois
 Douglas Township, Effingham County, Illinois
 Douglas Township, Iroquois County, Illinois

Iowa 
 Douglas Township, Adams County, Iowa
 Douglas Township, Appanoose County, Iowa
 Douglas Township, Audubon County, Iowa
 Douglas Township, Boone County, Iowa
 Douglas Township, Bremer County, Iowa
 Douglas Township, Clay County, Iowa
 Douglas Township, Harrison County, Iowa
 Douglas Township, Ida County, Iowa
 Douglas Township, Madison County, Iowa
 Douglas Township, Mitchell County, Iowa
 Douglas Township, Montgomery County, Iowa
 Douglas Township, Page County, Iowa
 Douglas Township, Polk County, Iowa
 Douglas Township, Sac County, Iowa
 Douglas Township, Shelby County, Iowa, in Shelby County, Iowa
 Douglas Township, Union County, Iowa, in Union County, Iowa
 Douglas Township, Webster County, Iowa

Kansas 
 Douglas Township, Jackson County, Kansas
 Douglas Township, Stafford County, Kansas, a township in Stafford County, Kansas

Minnesota 
 Douglas Township, Dakota County, Minnesota

Nebraska 
 Douglas Township, Saunders County, Nebraska

North Dakota 
 Douglas Township, McLean County, North Dakota, a township in North Dakota

See also 
 Douglass Township (disambiguation)

Township name disambiguation pages